Guelile is a town located in southern Djibouti. Guelile is one of the main border crossing for goods coming in and out of Djibouti, primarily from the ports of Djibouti.

Overview
Nearby towns and villages include Ali Sabieh, Holhol, Dewele, Aysha and Dire Dawa.

Climate and geography
Guelile has a Semi-arid climate (BSh) in Köppen-Geiger system. The average daytime temperatures during the summer months of June and August can rise to 35 °C (95 °F), with a low of 25 °C (77 °F) at night. The weather is cooler the rest of the year, averaging 25 °C (77 °F) during the day and 16 °C (60 °F) at nighttime.

References

Populated places in Djibouti